Figure skating was held as part of the 2009 New Zealand Winter Games. The competition was open to all ISU member nations. It was organized by the New Zealand Winter Games and the New Zealand Ice Skating Association. Skaters competed in the disciplines of men's and ladies' singles on the levels of senior, junior, and novice. The figure skating competition at the New Zealand Winter Games was held between 28 and 30 August at the Dunedin Ice Stadium in Dunedin.

Senior results

Men

Ladies

 WD = Withdrawn

Junior results

Men

Ladies

Novice results

Boys

Girls

 WD = Withdrawn

References

External links
 Winter Games NZ
 
 Detailed results and protocols at the New Zealand Ice Skating Association

2009 in figure skating
Figure skating in New Zealand
New Zealand Winter Games
2009 New Zealand Winter Games